Donald Anthony Preziosi (born January 12, 1941) is an American art historian. He is Emeritus Professor of Art History at the University of California, Los Angeles.  In August 2007, he became the MacGeorge Fellow at the University of Melbourne. He is a past president of the Semiotic Society of America (1985).

In his writing he combines disciplines as diverse as intellectual history, critical theory and museology. His 1998 book The Art of Art History: A Critical Anthology is considered 'the most widely used English-language introduction to art history'.

At UCLA, Professor Preziosi developed the art history critical theory program and the UCLA museum studies program.  At Oxford, he held the Slade Professorship of Fine Arts in 2001, where he delivered a series of lectures entitled Seeing Through Art History.

Education
Preziosi received his bachelor's degree from Fairfield University and his master's degree in Linguistics and a Ph.D. in art history from Harvard University.

Bibliography
 LABRYS (Charlton Press, New Haven), 1970)
 Architecture, Language, and Meaning (Mouton, The Hague), 1979
 The Semiotics of the Built Environment (Indiana Univ Press, Bloomington & London), 1979
 Minoan Architectural Design (Mouton, Berlin), 1983
 Rethinking Art History: Meditations on a Coy Science (Yale University Press, New Haven & London), 1989
 The Ottoman City and Its Parts: Urban Structure & Social Order, Irene Bierman, Rifa'at Ali Abou-El-Haj & Donald Preziosi, eds.1992; [Co-Editor and two introductory essays]
 The Art of Art History: A Critical Anthology (edited, with two essays and 10 introductory essays; Oxford University Press, Oxford & New York, 1998)
 Aegean Art and Architecture (with Louise Hitchcock; Oxford University Press, Oxford & New York, 1999)
 Brain of the Earth's Body: Museums & the Fabrication of Modernity (Minnesota University Press, Minneapolis & London, 1999)
 In the Aftermath of Art: Ethics, Aesthetics, and Politics (Routledge, 2005) – essays on visual culture and art history, 1988-2003, with a Critical Commentary by Johanne Lamoureux

External links
Dictionary of Art Historians Profile 
UCLA Professor Profile

References

American art historians
American semioticians
Fairfield University alumni
Harvard University alumni
University of California, Los Angeles faculty
Living people
1941 births
Slade Professors of Fine Art (University of Oxford)
Historians from California
Presidents of the Semiotic Society of America